Benjamin Nehemiah Solomon (born c. 1790 in Poland) was the first translator of the New Testament into Yiddish, published by the London Jews Society in 1821. Solomon was a Polish-Jewish convert to Christianity who had moved to England. The Hebrew Bible itself had already been translated into Yiddish by Jekuthiel Blitz of Wittmund and printed in Amsterdam in 1679.

References

1790 births
19th-century deaths
Year of birth uncertain
Year of death unknown
English Jews
English people of Polish-Jewish descent
Jewish translators of the Bible
Translators of the Bible into Yiddish
19th-century translators
Converts to Christianity from Judaism